This is a list of seasons completed by the Wake Forest Demon Deacons football team. Representing Wake Forest University in Winston-Salem, North Carolina, the Demon Deacons are members of the Atlantic Coast Conference in the NCAA Division I FBS. They play their home games out of Truist Field, and are currently led by head coach Dave Clawson.

The Demon Deacons began playing football in 1888, competing as an independent for several decades until joining the Southern Conference in 1936. After 17 years in the SoCon, the Deacons joined the ACC as a charter member in 1953, and have competed in the league ever since. Wake Forest won their first ACC championship in 1970, and captured their first Atlantic Division title in 2006, culminating with a victory over Georgia Tech in the 2006 ACC Championship Game. The Demon Deacons have competed in 16 bowl games as of 2021, having won ten, and have currently made a bowl game in six consecutive seasons, which is the longest streak in program history. Wake Forest has finished the season ranked in the AP Poll on five occasions, most recently in the 2021 campaign which was one of the most successful seasons in school history, as Wake posted an 11–3 mark and was the ACC runner-up.

Seasons

Notes

References

Wake Forest

Wake Forest Demon Deacons football seasons